Mitrella steyni is a species of sea snail in the family Columbellidae, the dove snails.

References

steyni
Gastropods described in 2009